Algernon “Algie” Stanley Smith (14 February 1890 – 28 July 1978) was a British Protestant Christian missionary in Uganda and Ruanda.

Personal life

Early life 
Algernon Charles “Algie” Stanley Smith was born on 14 February 1890 in Luara Shansi, China, the son of Stanley P. Smith, and his Norwegian wife Sophie de Reuter, who were missionaries in China.  His mother died when he was only one year old.  His father remarried after two years, and had three more children, his half brothers and sister.  At the age of six he went to a boarding school at Chefoo for three years, until the family went to England in 1899.  They left for furlough so were not in China at the time of the Boxer Rebellion.

Education 
After two years in England Algie’s parents returned to China leaving Algie in England for his education.  During this period the “Watney Sisters”, Alice and Emily of Croydon, Surrey were his guardians.  They were daughters of James Watney the brewer, and through their inherited wealth were very strong supporters of Christian Mission and of their local church.  Through their sponsorship Algie was educated at Winchester College and Trinity College, Cambridge where he matriculated in 1908 and studied medicine.   Having completed his studies at Cambridge he went on to further medical studies at St George's Hospital, London, qualifying in 1914.

Family 
On 7 January 1919 Algie married Lillian Zoe Sharp (1891-1980), sister of his great friend and fellow missionary Leonard Sharp, at Wimbledon parish church.  They had two sons and two daughters:

Olive Nora Stanley-Smith (1920-2013)
Alice Eve Stanley-Smith (1922-2006)
Dr Geoffrey Stanley-Smith (1924-2014)
James Stanley-Smith (b. 1929)

Missionary Career

Missionary call 
Although his parents were missionaries, Algie’s call to missionary service was personal and based on his own faith and calling.  Together with his friend Leonard Sharp, he accepted the call to missionary service while at Cambridge in 1910. Dr Algie Stanley Smith and his close friend Dr Leonard Sharp were convinced that God had called them to work in Ruanda and offered to the Church Missionary Society for that work.

Missionary service 
Both Smith and Sharp were accepted by CMS.  They started work at Mengo Hospital in Uganda.  In December 1916 they made an exploratory visit to Ruanda.  The CMS Uganda missionary committee received an appeal for medical help from Rwandans in Ruanda and Kigezi in 1917. The committee in London were unable to agree to this expansion of work because of the lack of funds, but the two doctors began to raise funds independently and by 1919 were able to guarantee support both for four years' work and for a hospital.  In the early days support was given and organised by 'Friends of Ruanda', but in 1926 the Ruanda Council was formed as a CMS committee in charge of the administration of the work. In 1929 it took full financial responsibility for the mission, though it was not separated from the CMS mission in Uganda until 1933.

Legacy 
Algie died on 28 July 1978 in Chorley Wood.  The Rwanda Mission continued to send missionaries to Uganda, Ruanda, Burundi and Eastern Congo.  Ruanda Mission changed its name to Mid-Africa Ministry (MAM), and in 1999 was re-integrated into CMS and continues to provide health care.

References

1890 births
1978 deaths
Healthcare in Uganda
English Protestant missionaries
Protestant missionaries in Uganda
Alumni of Trinity College, Cambridge
Christian medical missionaries
British expatriates in Uganda
Protestant missionaries in Rwanda
British expatriates in Rwanda